The Rolls-Royce Pennine was a British 46-litre air-cooled sleeve valve engine with 24 cylinders arranged in an X formation.  It was an enlarged version of the 22-litre Exe; a prototype engine was built and tested, but never flew.  The project was terminated in 1945, being superseded by the jet engine.

A 100-litre 5,000 hp X32 (twin-X16) version of the Exe/Pennine, originally known as the Exe 100, was to have become the Rolls-Royce Snowdon.

Rolls-Royce air-cooled engines, intended for commercial transport aeroplane use, were named after British mountains, e.g. The Pennines and Snowdon.

Specifications (Pennine)

See also

References

Notes

Bibliography

 Gunston, Bill. World Encyclopedia of Aero Engines. Cambridge, England. Patrick Stephens Limited, 1989. 
 Rubbra, A.A. Rolls-Royce Piston Aero Engines - a designer remembers: Historical Series no 16 :Rolls-Royce Heritage Trust, 1990. 

Pennine
1940s aircraft piston engines
Sleeve valve engines
X engines